Perrona micro is a species of sea snail, a marine gastropod mollusk in the family Clavatulidae.

Description

Distribution
This species occurs in the Atlantic Ocean off West Africa and Angola.

References

 Rolan, E., Ryall, P. & Horro, J., 2008. Notes on West African Perrona (Gastropoda: Clavatulidae), with the description of a new species. Iberus 26(1): 5-16

External links
 

micro
Gastropods described in 2008